Jaun Kotzé (born 18 May 1992 in Musina, South Africa). He has 1 sibling and 3 half sibling. His father's name is Tinus Kotze.His biological sister's name is Marisa Kotze. And three half siblings by the name of:
Markus Kotze
La-Rochelle Kotze
AJ Kotze
He is currently married to Gizela Kotze
Juan is a South African rugby union player, playing with Beaune in the Fédérale 1 in France. His regular position is fly-half.

Career

Youth and Varsity Cup rugby

In 2008, he was selected for the  side that played at the Under-16 Grant Khomo Week tournament in Ermelo. He was subsequently selected in a South African Under-16 Elite squad.

During the second half of 2011, he played for the  side in the 2011 Under-19 Provincial Championship, the  side in the 2011 Under-21 Provincial Championship and for the senior side.

He also played some Varsity Cup rugby. In 2014, he represented  in the Varsity Cup competition, making six appearances.

Falcons

He made a total of five starts for the Falcons during the competition, scoring 47 points.

Six appearances followed in the 2012 Vodacom Cup competition, with a tally of 59 points putting him in eighth place on the scoring charts. He scored 35 points in ten appearances – mostly being used as a substitute during the 2012 Currie Cup First Division.

40 points in seven appearances followed in the 2013 Vodacom Cup before he scored 90 points for the Falcons during the 2013 Currie Cup First Division to end as their top scorer and fifth overall.

Lazio

Kotzé joined Italian National Championship of Excellence side Lazio for the 2015–2016 season. He scored 76 points in 14 starts in a season that saw Lazio finish in eighth place in the competition.

References

South African rugby union players
Living people
1992 births
Sportspeople from Messina
Rugby union fly-halves
Rugby union fullbacks
Falcons (rugby union) players
Tshwane University of Technology alumni
Rugby union players from Limpopo